Benue North-West Senatorial District is well known as Zone B in Benue State. The senatorial district has seven local governments which include Buruku, Gboko, Tarka, Guma, Makurdi, Gwer and Gwer West. There are 90 electoral wards and 1,286 polling units as of 2019 polls. The current representative of Benue North-West Senatorial District is Emmanuel Orke-Jev of the People's Democratic Party, PDP.

List of senators representing Benue North-West District

Notes

References 

Politics of Benue State
Senatorial districts in Nigeria